The 2015 Champions Tennis League was the second edition of the Champions Tennis League.

Format
The 2015 edition of CTL was announced by Vijay Amritraj on 23 September 2015, at a press conference in Mumbai. The press conference also saw the draft of the players into each team. In 2015, CTL featured six city based teams across India and saw 13 matches played over a 2-week period between 23 November and 6 December. The winners' prize money was Rs. 1 crore, while the runner-up prize was Rs. 50 lakhs.

Each tie will consist of 5 sets with each set being considered as a match. Unlike the 2014 edition, the winner of a match was the player/doubles team that wins 5 games, not 6. The winner of the tie was the team that wins the highest number of games across all 5 sets.

Teams

Players
	 
Zone A

Mumbai Tennis Masters

Zone B
 Nagpur Orangers

Raipur Rangers

Hyderabad Aces

Punjab Marshalls

V Chennai Warriors

Group round

Matches

Standings

Zone A

Zone B

Final

Broadcasting rights
In India, all Champions Tennis League matches broadcast live on Sony SIX HD and Sony SIX who has the exclusive broadcasting rights for the event in the Indian subcontinent. 

The Tennis Channel broadcast the Champions Tennis League across the USA.

References

External links
 Champions Tennis League official website

Champions Tennis League
2015 in Indian tennis
C